Jolanda Felicia Jones (born November 6, 1965)  is an American attorney, politician, and television personality, as well as a former city councilor and heptathlete. Jones is currently a member of the Texas House of Representatives, representing the 147th district. She was sworn in on May 18, 2022.

Early life and education
Jones, the oldest of five children, was born to John Ferrell Jones and Gwendolyn Jean West and raised in Houston's Third Ward. During her childhood, she lost her father, brother, and immediate family members to either suicide or murder. Despite her tough circumstances, Jones' mother was insistent that she succeed academically. At Elsik High School, Jones was an All-American basketball player and track and field athlete. She earned an athletic scholarship to the University of Houston, and graduated with a political science degree. At the 1987 Pan American Games she won bronze, and in 1989 she was US champion. Representing the University of Houston, she was a three time NCAA champion (1986, 1987, 1989). In 1995, she earned her J.D. from the University of Houston Law Center.

In 2004, she competed in Survivor: Palau, where she was the third person eliminated from the game, finishing in 18th place. From 2008 until 2011 she was a member of the Houston City Council, school board member and is a criminal defense lawyer in Texas. In 2016, she appeared on the reality series "Sisters in Law", which focused on several Black female attorneys practicing in Houston, Texas.

Jones is openly lesbian, though she was once married to an abusive husband. Her experiences made her an advocate for LGBTQ causes and domestic violence victims. In May 2022, Jones became the first Black member of the LGBTQ community elected to the Texas state legislature after winning the special election to succeed retiring Representative Garnet Coleman in the Texas House District 147.

References

External links 

 Official website
 Profile at trackfield.brinkster.net

Living people
1959 births
Democratic Party members of the Texas House of Representatives
Texas lawyers
American heptathletes
African-American female track and field athletes
Pan American Games bronze medalists for the United States
Athletes (track and field) at the 1987 Pan American Games
Survivor (American TV series) contestants
Houston City Council members
Houston Cougars women's track and field athletes
Pan American Games medalists in athletics (track and field)
American athlete-politicians
Women city councillors in Texas
School board members in Texas
Medalists at the 1987 Pan American Games
Women state legislators in Texas
21st-century African-American people
21st-century African-American women
20th-century African-American sportspeople
20th-century African-American women
20th-century African-American people
21st-century American politicians
21st-century American women politicians
LGBT state legislators in Texas
Lesbian politicians